The Motorlet M-701 is a Czechoslovak jet engine. It was used to power the Aero L-29 Delfín jet trainer, with about 9,250 engines built between 1961 and 1989.

Development and design
In 1955, the Czechoslovakian aero-engine company Motorlet commenced design of a new turbojet engine to power the Aero L-29, a jet trainer being designed by Aero for a competition to equip all Warsaw Pact air forces. The resulting design, designated Motorlet M-701 was a single-shaft centrifugal-compressor turbojet and was the first jet engine designed in Czechoslovakia (although Motorlet had previously built the Klimov VK-1 under license).

The M-701 was first run in 1958, and engine no. 4 was tested on an Avia B-228 flying laboratory in December 1959. Engine no. 8 powered the third prototype L-29 when it flew on 12 July 1960 (the first two prototypes had flown the previous year powered by Rolls-Royce Viper engines). The L-29 was selected as the winner of the competition and was ordered in large numbers, with the M-701 entering production at Jinonice near Prague in 1961. By the time production ended in 1989, more than 9,250 had been built.

Applications
 Aero L-29 Delfín

Specifications

See also

References

1950s turbojet engines
Walter aircraft engines
Centrifugal-flow turbojet engines